Pyramid is an album by American jazz saxophonist Lee Konitz, pianist Paul Bley and guitarist Bill Connors recorded in 1977 and released on Bley's Improvising Artists label.

Critical reception

Scott Yanow on Allmusic said "due to the free nature of the pieces, the music is less exciting than one might hope. Everyone takes chances in their solos but several of the pieces wander on much too long. Overall this session does not reach the heights one might expect from these great players".

Track listing 
All compositions by Lee Konitz except where noted.

 "Pyramid" (Bill Connors) – 4:05
 "Out There" – 10:45
 "Talk to Me" (Connors) – 2:47
 "Tavia" – 4:32
 "Longer Than You Know" (Paul Bley) – 4:13
 "Play Blue" (Bley) – 9:22

Personnel 
Lee Konitz – alto saxophone, soprano saxophone
Paul Bley – piano, electric piano
Bill Connors – electric guitar, acoustic guitar

References 

) 

Lee Konitz albums
Paul Bley albums
Bill Connors albums
1977 albums
Improvising Artists Records albums
Albums recorded at Electric Lady Studios